WSTM may refer to:

Current stations:

 WSTM-TV, a television station (channel 19, virtual 3) licensed to Syracuse, New York, United States
 WSTM (FM), a radio station (91.3 FM) licensed to Kiel, Wisconsin, United States

Former stations:

 WQNU,  a radio station (103.1 FM) licensed to Lyndon, Kentucky, United States that used the WSTM call letters prior to 1978